Mike Wallace (born July 22, 1942) is an American historian. He specializes in the history of New York City, and in the history and practice of "public history". In 1998 he co-authored Gotham: A History of New York City to 1898, which in 1999 won the Pulitzer Prize in History. In 2017, he published a successor volume, Greater Gotham: A History of New York City from 1898 to 1919. Wallace is a Distinguished Professor of History at John Jay College of Criminal Justice (City University of New York), and at the Graduate Center, CUNY.

Early life and education
Wallace was born in Queens in 1942. The family moved to San Francisco in 1943 and returned to New York in 1949. He grew up in Fresh Meadows, Queens, Valley Stream, and Great Neck.

Wallace went to Columbia College in 1960. On graduating in 1964 he stayed on at Columbia University for graduate studies. With historian Richard Hofstadter as his adviser, his dissertation examined the emergence of the two-party system. He worked as Hofstadter’s research assistant, and in 1968 had his first article accepted by the American Historical Review.

In 1968 Wallace took part in the student strike at Columbia University. In 1969 he and Hofstadter wrote a documentary history of violence in the U.S.

Career
In 1970, he taught for a year at Franconia College. In 1971, Wallace accepted a teaching position at John Jay College of Criminal Justice.

In the early 1970s, Wallace began working with other historians of his generation who were “broadening the scope of American history by adding the voices of those previously excluded, such as women, blacks and the working class.” In 1973, Wallace helped launch, and for the next ten years directed, the Radical History Forum. He also participated in transforming the Radical Historians’ Newsletter, started in 1973, into the Radical History Review, by 1975, and then served as its editorial coordinator.

During the 1980s, Wallace wrote essays about the ways history gets presented – or misrepresented – to the general public, outside of schools and universities.  In 1996, these pieces were collected in a book called Mickey Mouse History and Other Essays on American Memory.

In 1998, he co-authored (with Edwin G. Burrows) Gotham: A History of New York City to 1898, which in 1999 won the Pulitzer Prize in History.

In 2000, Wallace founded the Gotham Center for New York City History, a non-profit organization. It is part of the Graduate Center of the City University of New York (CUNY)

The successor volume, Greater Gotham: A History of New York City from 1898 to 1919, was published on October 2, 2017.

Personal life

Wallace is married to Mexican author and playwright Carmen Boullosa. He was formerly married, in December 1969, to Nancy Greenough; in May 1973 to Elizabeth Fee and in October 1987 to historian and former Queen of Sikkim, Hope Cooke.

References

External links
 The Gotham Center website

Pulitzer Prize for History winners
1942 births
Living people
Historians of New York City
City University of New York faculty
John Jay College of Criminal Justice faculty
Columbia College (New York) alumni
Writers from New York City
20th-century American male writers
21st-century American male writers
21st-century American historians
20th-century American non-fiction writers
21st-century American non-fiction writers
American male non-fiction writers
Historians from New York (state)
People from Valley Stream, New York
People from Great Neck, New York
Columbia Graduate School of Arts and Sciences alumni